The Slaying of the Spaniards (also known as the Spanish Killings) was the last documented massacre in Icelandic history. Some Basque whalers went on a whaling expedition to Iceland and were killed after conflict in 1615 with local people in the region of the Westfjords.

Background
In the first half of the seventeenth century Spanish whalers set up the world's first large-scale whaling industry in Newfoundland. The center of this industry was some ten ports on the southern coast of Labrador. During the peak years of the 1560s and 1570s the fleet comprised around 30 ships manned by up to 2,000 men, who killed approximately 400 whales each year. By the beginning of the seventeenth century Spanish whaling had reached Iceland.

Massacre

The year 1615 was a difficult year in Iceland with ice up to shores until late summer and considerable loss of livestock. In mid-summer three Spanish whaling vessels put into Reykjarfjörður in Westfjords. Icelanders and the Spaniards had a mutual agreement at the beginning as they both had benefited from the enterprise. When the ships were ready for departure in late September a terrible gale arose and the ships were driven on the rocks and crushed. Most of the crew members survived (approx. 80). The captains Pedro de Aguirre and Esteban de Telleria wintered at Vatneyri (Patreksfjörður) and left for home the following year. The crew of Martin de Villafranca's ship split into two groups; one entered Ísafjarðardjúp, the other went to Bolungarvík and later to Þingeyri.

The first conflict arose when one group entered the empty house of a merchant of Þingeyri and stole some dried fish.
As retaliation, on 5 October, at night, a group of Icelanders entered the hut where the Spaniards were sleeping and killed 14 of them, only one young man called García, escaped. 
Captain  Martín de Villafranca of San Sebastián, whose father and grandfather had both been involved in Terra Nova whaling was among those who were killed.
The bodies were mutilated and sunken into water. Jón Guðmundsson the Learned wrote about the unjust and cruel deaths "dishonored  and sunken into sea, as if they were the worst pagans and not innocent Christians".
Three days after the first slaying, Ari Magnússon summoned a council at Súðavík and twelve judges agreed to declare as outlaws all the Spaniards.

On 13 October Martin and the other 17 of his group were killed at Æðey and Sandeyri in Ísafjarðardjúp, while they were fishing, by the troops commanded by Ari Magnússon.
According to Jón Guðmundsson, the victims were stabbed in the eyes, their ears, noses and had their genitals mutilated.
The captain, Martín de Villafranca, was injured in the shoulder and chest with an axe, but he managed to escape into the sea however he was stoned in the water and dragged to the shore where he was tortured to death.

Two verdicts were instigated by sheriff Ari Magnússon of Ögur, Ísafjarðardjúp in October 1615 and January 1616. The Spaniards were considered criminals after their ships were wrecked and in accordance with the Icelandic law book of 1281 it was decided that the only right thing to do was to kill as many of them as possible. An estimated 32 Spaniards were killed.

Aftermath
Jón Guðmundsson the Learned (1574–1658) wrote a critical account condemning the decision of the local sheriff to order the killings: A True Account of Spanish Men's Shipwrecks and Slayings. Jón says that they were unjustly killed; not wishing to take part in an attack on them, he fled south to Snæfellsnes.

On April 22, 2015, a descendant of one of the victims, Xabier Irujo, set up a stele in Hólmavík in memory of the massacre, along with Magnus Raffnson, whose ancestor was a perpetrator. In the occasion, Guðmundsson formally revoked Ari Magnússon's 1615 decree.

See also
History of Basque whaling in Iceland
History of Iceland
Timeline of Icelandic history

References

External links and sources
Slaying of Spaniards
Whaling in Iceland history
Eddurit Jóns Guðmundssonar lærða
1615.info

17th century in Iceland
Conflicts in 1615
1615 in Europe
Massacres in Iceland
Westfjords
17th century in Spain
Basque history
Whaling